Message from the King is a reggae album by Prince Far I and the Arabs, released in 1978.

Track listing
All tracks composed by Michael Williams and the Arabs:

Side one
"Message from the King"
"The Dream"
"Commandment of Drugs"
"Moses, Moses"
"Black Man Land"

Side two
"Concrete Column"
"Dry Bone"
"Foggy Road"
"Wisdom"
"Armageddon"

Personnel
Eric Clarke, Sly Dunbar, Leroy "Horsemouth" Wallace, Carlton "Santa" Davis - drums
Theophilus Beckford, Dennis Brown, Winston "Bo Pee" Bowen - piano
Errol "Tarzan" Nelson - organ
Earl "Chinna" Smith, Royal Soul - lead guitar
Eric "Bingy Bunny" Lamont, Errol "Flabba" Holt - rhythm guitar
Errol "Flabba" Holt - bass guitar
Eric "Fish" Clarke, Culture, Errol "Flabba" Holt, Michael Williams - vocals
Uziah "Sticky" Thompson, Eric Clarke - percussion
Technical
Dennis Morris - photography

Prince Far I albums
1978 albums
Dub albums